Pam Shriver and Helena Suková were the defending champions but did not compete that year.

Katrina Adams and Zina Garrison won in the final 6–3, 3–6, 7–6 against Mary Joe Fernández and Claudia Kohde-Kilsch.

Seeds
Champion seeds are indicated in bold text while text in italics indicates the round in which those seeds were eliminated.

 Katrina Adams /  Zina Garrison (champions)
 Lori McNeil /  Robin White (semifinals)
 Leila Meskhi /  Larisa Savchenko (semifinals)
 Mary Joe Fernández /  Claudia Kohde-Kilsch (final)

Draw

References
 1988 Toray Pan Pacific Open Doubles Draw

]
Doubles